Zmijanje embroidery ( / Zmijanjski vez) is a specific technique of embroidery practised by the women of villages in the area of Zmijanje on mountain Manjača, near Banja Luka in Bosnia and Herzegovina.

In 2014 it was included in the UNESCO Representative List of the Intangible Cultural Heritage of Humanity.

See also 

 List of World Heritage Sites in Bosnia and Herzegovina
 Pirot carpet

References

External links 

Intangible Cultural Heritage of Humanity
Bosnia and Herzegovina culture
Embroidery